Jack Fields may refer to:

Jack Fields (born 1952), Texas businessman and former Republican member of the United States House of Representatives
Jackie Fields, American boxer
Patch panel, aka Jack fields, devices used to route electrical signals

See also
John Fields (disambiguation)